The 1996 World Allround Speed Skating Championships were held on 14–16 February 1997 in the Ludwig-Schwabl-Stadion stadium in Inzell, Germany. This was the first World Championships where men and women competed at the same time and venue.

Title defenders were the 1995 world champions Gunda Niemann from Germany and Rintje Ritsma from the Netherlands. Both prolongated their titles.

Allround results

Men

NQ = Not qualified for the 10000 m (only the best 12 are qualified)NS=did not start* = Includes a fall

Women

NQ = Not qualified for the 5000 m (only the best 12 are qualified)NS= Did not start* = Includes a fall

References

External links
Results on SpeedSkatingNews

1996 World Allround
World Allround Speed Skating Championships
World Allround, 1996